This is a list of registered universities in Zambia. As of 2020, there were 9 registered public institutions and 54 registered private institutions in Zambia following regulations set forth by the Zambian Higher Education Authority.

Public Universities
 Chalimbana University
 Copperbelt University
 Kwame Nkrumah University
 Levy Mwanawasa Medical University
 Mukuba University
 Mulungushi University
 University of Zambia
 
 Palabana University
 Robert Kapasa Makasa University
 Unicohs University College

Private Universities
 Africa University
 Cavendish University (Lusaka)
 Central African Baptist University
 Chreso University
 Copperstone University
 Eden University
 Gideon Robert University
 Information and Communications University (ICU)
 Lusaka Apex Medical University
 Management College of Southern Africa (MANCOSA) (Lusaka)
 Northrise University
 Paglory University
 Rockview University
 Rusangu University
 South Valley University
 St. Bonaventure University
 Texila American University Zambia
 UNICAF University
 University of Lusaka
 Victoria Falls University of Technology (VFU)
 Zambia Catholic University
 Zambian Open University
 
 African Christian University (Lusaka)
 African Open University (Ndola)
 Ambassador International University (Chongwe)
 Atlantic African Oriental Multicultural (ATAFOM) University
 Ballsbridge University
 Bethel University (Mongu)
 Blessing University of Excellence
 Brook Besor University (Lusaka)
 Chikowa Technical College (Mambwe)
 City University of Science and Technology
 DMI Saint Eugene University
 Evangelical University
 Greenlight University
 Harvest University
 Justo Mwale University
 Kalulushi Training Center School of Health Sciences
 Kenneth Kaunda Metropolitan University
 Kopaline University
 Livingstone International University for Tourism Excellence & Business Management (LIUTEBM) 
 Mansfield University, Zambia
 Mosa University
 Oak University
 Open Window Zambia
 Open Christian University of Business & Theology
 St. Dominic's Major Seminary
 Sunningdale University
 Supershine University
 The University of Barotseland
 Trans-Africa Christian University
 Trinity University, Zambia
 Twin Palm Leadership University
 United Church of Zambia University
 University of Edenberg
 University of the Foundation for Cross-cultural Education
 West East University
 Yesbud University
 Zambian Christian University
 North End University
 Zambian Royal Medical University
 ZCAS University

References

External links 
https://www.moge.gov.zm/colleges-of-education/
https://www.mohe.gov.zm/
https://www.zaqa.gov.zm/higher-education-institutions/

Universities
Zambia
 Lists
Zambia